Daniel Hediger (born 14 October 1958) is a Swiss biathlete. He competed in the men's sprint event at the 1994 Winter Olympics.

References

1958 births
Living people
Swiss male biathletes
Olympic biathletes of Switzerland
Biathletes at the 1994 Winter Olympics
Place of birth missing (living people)